William Moore (1931 – 24 April 2003) was an Irish hurler, who played as a midfielder, and is best known for his partnership with Gerald Murphy on the Cork senior hurling team.

Career

Moore first came to prominence as a hurler at colleges level with St. Colman's College in Fermoy. At club level he enjoyed a distinguished career with a variety of clubs, including Lisgoold, Bride Rovers and Carrigtwohill, while he was also selected for divisional side Imokilly.

At inter-county level Moore first played for the Cork minor hurling team in 1948, however, his two seasons in this grade ended without championship success. He made his debut for the Cork senior hurling team during the 1950 championship, however, he was dropped from the panel shortly afterwards. Impressive form at club level saw Moore return to the Cork senior team in 1954. It was a successful season that culminated with the winning of an All-Ireland Championship medal at midfield. Moore was once again dropped from the panel but made one final appearance in 1957.

Honours

Cork
All-Ireland Senior Hurling Championship (1): 1954
Munster Senior Hurling Championship (1): 1954

References

1931 births
2003 deaths
Bride Rovers hurlers
Lisgoold hurlers
Carrigtwohill hurlers
Imokilly hurlers
Cork inter-county hurlers
All-Ireland Senior Hurling Championship winners